James Stott (15 November 1919 – 6 July 1994) was an English professional rugby league footballer who played in the 1930s, 1940s and 1950s. Jim Stott was a Private in the British Army during World War II, and appeared for Wigan as a World War II guest player.

Background
Stott was born in Prescot, Lancashire, England, he was a pupil at Merton Bank School, St. Helens, and he died aged 74.

Playing career

International honours
Jim Stott won caps for England while at St. Helens, in a 1943 match against Wales and in 1946 and 1947 matches against France, and won caps for Great Britain while at St. Helens, in a 1947 match against New Zealand.

Other notable matches
Jim Stott played in United Glass Bottle's 5–48 defeat by Hunslet in the 1938–39 Challenge Cup first-round match at Parkside, Hunslet on Saturday 4 February 1939, he was a reserve for Northern Command XIII against a Rugby League XIII at Thrum Hall, Halifax on Saturday 21 March 1942.

Honoured at St Helens R.F.C.
Jim Stott is a St Helens R.F.C. Hall of Fame inductee.

References

External links
Profile at saints.org.uk
Saints bid to halt Reds' revolution
Saints book Anfield date
Statistics at wigan.rlfans.com

1919 births
1994 deaths
British Army personnel of World War II
British Army soldiers
England national rugby league team players
English rugby league players
Great Britain national rugby league team players
Lancashire rugby league team players
Place of death missing
Rugby league centres
Rugby league players from Prescot
St Helens R.F.C. players
Wigan Warriors wartime guest players